Cephalozoa are an extinct class of primitive segmented marine organisms within the Phylum Proarticulata from the Ediacaran period. They possessed bilateral symmetry and were characterized by a thin, rounded body.

Description

Unlike the other classes of proarticulates, the segmentation of the body is not complete and shows a "head" with fine distribution channels. Some species of the Yorgiidae family also show some asymmetry.

They were discovered in Russia near the White Sea in the Arkhangelsk region, where they lived during the Ediacaran, approximately 635 to 540 Ma (millions of years ago).

Taxonomy
Cephalozoa includes the families Yorgiidae and Sprigginidae:

Yorgiidae
† Archaeaspinus Ivantsov, 2007 (synonym of Archaeaspis)
† Archaeaspinus fedonkini Ivantsov, 2001
† Yorgia Ivantsov, 1999
† Yorgia waggoneri Ivantsov, 1999

Sprigginidae
† Spriggina Glaessner, 1958
† Spriggina floundersi Glaessner, 1958
† Spriggina ovata Glaessner and Wade, 1966 now considered synonym of Marywadea ovata.
† Marywadea Glaessner, 1976
† Marywadea ovata Glaessner and Wade, 1966
† Cyanorus Ivantsov, 2004
† Cyanorus singularis Ivantsov, 2004
† Praecambridium Glaessner and Wade, 1966, previously classified as Yorgiidae; now considered a juvenile form of Spriggina
† Praecambridium sigillum Glaessner and Wade, 1966

The genus Andiva sometimes includes Cephalozoa:

Andiva Fedonkin, 2002
Andiva ivantsovi Fedonkin, 2002

Recent studies indicate that the family Yorgiidae could be included or closely related to the class Vendiamorpha.

See also

Ediacaran fauna

References

Cephalozoa
Ediacaran life